Laura Nappi (born 11 December 1949) is an Italian sprinter. She competed in the women's 100 metres at the 1972 Summer Olympics.

References

External links
 

1949 births
Living people
Athletes (track and field) at the 1972 Summer Olympics
Italian female sprinters
Olympic athletes of Italy
Mediterranean Games gold medalists for Italy
Mediterranean Games medalists in athletics
Sportspeople from Genoa
Athletes (track and field) at the 1971 Mediterranean Games
Olympic female sprinters
20th-century Italian women
21st-century Italian women